Oh Yeah! is an album by the American power pop band the Spongetones, released in 1991. It was issued by the Shoes' Black Vinyl Records, and was one of the first non-Shoes albums to be released by label. Oh Yeah! was reissued in Japan by Sony Records, in 1995.

Production
The album was produced by band member Jamie Hoover, and was recorded at his house in the Charlotte, North Carolina, area.

Critical reception

Stereo Review thought that "the fourteen cuts are actually an embarrassment of riches, like a greatest-hits album from the land of ought-to-be." Trouser Press wrote that "the disc’s only real negative aspect is the disappointingly thin-sounding production." 

The Chicago Tribune praised "Am I Dancing or What?", writing that it "finds the 'Tones taking a slow ska boat down the Mersey and jumping off for an exuberant psychedelic break in midstream." The Virginian-Pilot determined that "the chinka-chinka guitar, Lennon-esque harmonica and perfect harmonies give the disc a feel that is refreshingly unpretentious."

AllMusic called the album "infectious Beatlesque power pop ... easily their best songwriting." MusicHound Rock: The Essential Album Guide concluded that Oh Yeah! "assimilates the Spongetones' influences into a brilliant work that's still beholden to the Beatles, but less slavish in its devotion."

Track listing

References

1991 albums